= Twisted Gyros =

Restaurant in Hillsboro, Oregon, U.S.

- Interactive map of Twisted Gyros

Restaurant information
- Location: Hillsboro, Oregon, United States
- Coordinates: 45.5314°N 122.9580°W
- Website: twistedgyros.com

Twisted Gyros is a restaurant in Hillsboro, Oregon, United States.

== History ==
Owners Jason and Widi Kupper launched the business as a food truck in 2019.

== Reception ==
The restaurant ranked second in Yelp's "Top 100 Places to Eat in 2025" list.
